Fulls is an unincorporated community in Champaign County, Illinois, United States. Fulls is located along U.S. Route 150 west of St. Joseph.

Full's Siding elevator (Section 17, St. Joseph Township) was built on the Big Four—Conrail System railroad, now the Kickapoo Rail Trail. The concrete silos and steel bins are between Mayview and St. Joseph.

References

Unincorporated communities in Champaign County, Illinois
Unincorporated communities in Illinois